Adem Boudjemline (born 28 February 1994 in Sétif) is an Algerian Greco-Roman wrestler. At the 2016 Summer Olympics he competed in the Men's Greco-Roman -85 kg where he finished in 17th place after losing to Nikolay Bayryakov of Bulgaria in the 1/8 finals round.

He represented Algeria at the 2020 Summer Olympics held in Tokyo, Japan. He competed in the 97 kg event.

He won the gold medal in his event at the 2022 African Wrestling Championships held in El Jadida, Morocco.

References

External links
 
 
 

1994 births
Living people
Olympic wrestlers of Algeria
Wrestlers at the 2016 Summer Olympics
Wrestlers at the 2020 Summer Olympics
African Games gold medalists for Algeria
African Games medalists in wrestling
Algerian male sport wrestlers
Mediterranean Games silver medalists for Algeria
Mediterranean Games medalists in wrestling
Competitors at the 2015 African Games
Competitors at the 2018 Mediterranean Games
Competitors at the 2019 African Games
African Wrestling Championships medalists
21st-century Algerian people